Daniel Lamellari (born 31 December 1989) is an Albanian footballer who currently plays as a goalkeeper for KS Devolli in the Albanian Second Division.

References

1989 births
Living people
Footballers from Korçë
Albanian footballers
Association football goalkeepers
FK Dinamo Tirana players
KF Laçi players
KS Sopoti Librazhd players
KS Kastrioti players
KS Pogradeci players
FC Kamza players
Kategoria e Parë players
Kategoria e Dytë players